Muhammad Husayn Tabataba'i or Sayyid Mohammad Hossein Tabataba'i (16 March 1903 – 15 November 1981) was an Iranian scholar, theorist, philosopher and one of the most prominent thinkers of modern Shia Islam. He is perhaps best known for his Tafsir al-Mizan, a twenty-seven-volume work of tafsir (Quranic exegesis), which he produced between 1954 and 1972. He is commonly known as Allameh Tabataba'i and the Allameh Tabataba'i University in Tehran is named after him.

Biography
He received his earlier education in his native Tabriz city, mastering the elements of Arabic and the religious sciences, and at about the age of twenty set out for the great Shiite university of Najaf to continue more advanced studies. He studied at Najaf, under masters such as Ali Tabatabaei (in gnosis), Mirza Muhammad Husain Na'ini, Sheykh Muhammad Hossein Qaravi Esfahani (in Fiqh and Jurisprudence), Sayyid Abu'l-Qasim Khwansari (in Mathematics), as well as studying the standard texts of Avicenna's Shifa, the Asfar of Sadr al-Din Shirazi, and the Tamhid al-qawa'id of Ibn Turkah.

Published works

In Najaf, Tabataba'i developed his major contributions in the fields of Tafsir (interpretation), philosophy, and history of the Shi'a faith. In philosophy the most important of his works is Usul-i falsafeh va ravesh-e-realism (The Principles of Philosophy and the Method of Realism), which has been published in five volumes with explanatory notes and the commentary of Morteza Motahhari. If Ayatollah Haeri is considered the reviver of Qom's hawza in an organizational sense, Tabataba'i's contributions to the field of tafsir, philosophy and mysticism represent the intellectual revitalization of the hawza with lasting implications for the curriculum.

List of publications
 Tafsir al-Mizan
Shi'a Islam
The Principles of Philosophy and the Method of Realism ( Usul-i falsafeh va ravesh-i ri'alism) in five volumes, with the commentary of Murtada Mutahhari.
 Glosses al-kifayah. Glosses upon the new edition of the Asfar of Sadr al-Din Shirazi Mulla Sadra appearing under the direction of 'Allameh Tabataba'i of which seven volumes have appeared.
 Dialogues with Professor Corbin Two volumes based on conversations carried out between 'Allameh Tabataba'i and Henry Corbin of which the first volume was printed as the yearbook of Maktab-i tashayyu’, 1339 (A.H. Solar)
 Risalah dar hukumat-i islami, (Treatise on Islamic Government).
 Hashiyah-i kifayah (Glosses upon al-Kifayah).
 Risalah dar quwwah wafi'(Treatise on Potentiality and Actuality).
 Risalah dar ithbat-i dha~t (Treatise on the Proof of the Divine Essence).
 Risalah dar sifat (Treatise on the Divine Attributes).
 Risalah dar ata (Treatise on the Divine Acts).
 Risalah dar wasa'il (Treatise on Means).
 Risalah dar insan qabl al-dunya (Treatise on Man before the World)
 Risalah dar insan fi al-dunya (Treatise on Man in the World).
 Risalah dar insan ba'd al-dunya (Treatise on Man after the World).
 Risalah dar nubuwwat (Treatise on Prophecy).
 Risalah dar wilayat (Treatise on Initiation).
 Risalah dar mushtaqqat (Treatise on Derivatives).
 Risalah dar burhan (Treatise on Demonstration).
 Risalah dar mughalatah (Treatise on Sophism).
 Risalah dar tahlil (Treatise on Analysis).
 Risalah dar tarkib (Treatise on Synthesis).
 Risalah dar i’tibarat (Treatise on Contingents).
 Risalah dar nubuwwat wa manamat (Treatise on Prophecy and Dreams)
 Manza’mah dar rasm-i- khatt-i-nasta’liq (Poem on the Method of Writing the Nasta’liq Style of Calligraphy).
 Ali wa al-falsafat al-ilahiya (Ali and Metaphysics)
 Qur'an dar Islam (The Qur'an in Islam).

Poetry
Tabataba'i was a poet who composed mainly in Persian, but occasionally in Arabic. He also wrote articles and essays.

Pupils 
Some of his pupils include:

 Allamah Sayyid Muhammad Husayn Husayni Tihrani
 Morteza Motahhari
 Hassan Hassanzadeh Amoli
 Musa al-Sadr
 Hussein-Ali Montazeri
 Seyyed Hossein Nasr
 Ja'far Sobhani
 Sayyid Muhammad Muhsin Husayni Tihrani
 Mohammad Ezodin Hosseini Zanjani

See also

Islamic scholars
Islamization of knowledge
Islamic philosophy
Ayatollah al-Shirazi
List of Marjas
Allameh Majlesi
Hossein Nasr
Tafsir al-Mizan

References

External links

Ashams Al-Sate'ah (الشمس الساطعة - the Bright Sun) - in Memory of Allameh Tabataba'i by Allameh Tehrani
Biography of Allameh Tabataba'i by Seyyed Hossein Nasr, preface of Shiite Islam
Biography of Allameh Tabatabaei Taken from: “Stories from the life of Allama Tabataba'i(R) by Ahmad Luqmani, Allameh Tabataba'i, Meezane Ma`refit”, translated by S.K. Yusufali, Qum, Iran, 2006.
Biography of Allameh Tabataba'i  by Mohammad Yazdi

Some of his works
Some of the books of Muhammad Husayn Tabatabai in Bookfinder.com
Islamic Teachings In Brief
The Qur'an in Islam 
al-Mizan
Muhammad in the Mirror of Islam 
Shiite Islam
Light Within Me
A Shia Anthology, A Shi'ite Anthology
VICEGERENCY (Risalah al-Wilayah)
Kernel of the Kernel – A Shi'a approach to Sufism
 (153 KiB)

Iranian writers
Quranic exegesis scholars
People from Tabriz
Iranian expatriates in Iraq
1903 births
1981 deaths
Iranian Shia clerics
20th-century Iranian philosophers
Iranian Muslim mystics
Burials at Fatima Masumeh Shrine